Circle K Stores, Inc. is a chain of convenience stores that is headquartered in Tempe, Arizona, and owned by Alimentation Couche-Tard, based in Laval, Canada. Founded in 1951 in El Paso, Texas, the company filed for bankruptcy protection in 1990 and went through several owners, before being acquired by Alimentation Couche-Tard in 2003. As of February 2020, Circle K has 9,799 stores in North America, 2,697 stores in Europe, and an additional 2,380 stores operating under franchise agreements worldwide.

In 2015, Circle K unveiled a new logo and brand identity, and Couche-Tard announced that it would deploy the brand globally, including English-speaking Canada (rebranding from the Mac's brand), Europe (rebranding from the Statoil brand), and the United States (rebranding from the Kangaroo Express brand and updating the existing Circle K brand).

Overview
Since the 1980s, Circle K has been the largest chain of company-owned and operated (non-franchised) convenience stores in the United States. With 7,230 stores overall in the United States, Circle K is second to 7-Eleven's 9,348 stores (as of July 2019). As of February 2020, there are more than 14,800 stores with the Circle K brand worldwide.

Within the United States, Circle K owns and operates stores in 47 states (the three states without being Nebraska, Utah and Wisconsin),  with the largest concentration of stores found in Louisiana. Fuel is sold under various brands, with the Circle K and Shell brands as the most common. Other brands of fuel sold at Circle K stores include Valero, BP, Exxon, Marathon, Irving, Mobil, Esso and Phillips 66. Approximately 13% of stores worldwide do not sell gasoline.

Circle K operates stores in the United States, Canada, Europe (the Nordics, Baltics, Poland, Russia, Ireland and the United Kingdom), and Hong Kong, and has franchises in Mexico (it partners with the Mexican stores "Tiendas Extra" created by Modelo Group), Cambodia, China, Egypt, Guam, Honduras, Indonesia, Jamaica, Macau, New Zealand, Saudi Arabia, the United Arab Emirates and Vietnam. In Hong Kong and Macau, the stores are called OK in reference to the circle around the K. Circle K Hong Kong was founded in 1985 by Li & Fung Retailing (later Fung Retailing) as licensee of the name, but sold back to Couche-Tard in 2020. Circle K had 387 franchised locations throughout Hong Kong as of May 2020.

The Circle K brand entered the Canadian market in 2008, in connection with Couche-Tard's acquisition of Irving Oil's convenience store network. By 2019, more than 800 Mac's branded stores had been rebranded to Circle K throughout central and western Canada.

In September 2015, Couche-Tard announced that Circle K would become the worldwide brand of all of its convenience stores, replacing Mac's, Kangaroo Express, and Statoil brands (except the Couche-Tard brand in Quebec and the INGO brand in Europe). This global rebrand included the introduction of a new logo incorporating elements of its existing brands, improvements to its product offerings and technology, and investing in store-level improvements aimed at improving the customer experience. The rebranding occurred over the following five years and as of March 2020, all of Europe and 85% of North America had been updated with the Circle K brand and logo.

History

Entrepreneur Fred Hervey purchased three Kay's Food Stores in El Paso, Texas, in 1951. Hervey renamed the stores as "Circle K Food Stores, Inc." rather than "Kay." He grew the Circle K chain into neighboring New Mexico and Arizona, which has been the company's home base since 1957. (Hervey would go on to serve two terms as mayor of El Paso.)

By 1975, there were 1,000 Circle K stores across the U.S. In 1979, Circle K first expanded its reach into foreign markets via a licensing agreement which established the first Circle K stores in Japan by UNY. Until 2018, Circle K stores in Japan were run by the FamilyMart Company, that was named Circle K Sunkus Company until 2016 and was named Circle K Japan Company until 2004, which licensed the Circle K brand from Alimentation Couche-Tard. In 2018, all Circle K stores in Japan were converted to FamilyMart stores. In 1983, the number of stores increased to 2,180 with the purchase of the 960-store UtoteM chain in the western and southern United States.

Karl Eller, a prominent Phoenix businessman, served as the company's CEO from 1983 to 1990. During that time, Eller built Circle K into the second largest convenience store operation and the largest publicly owned convenience store chain in the U.S. with 4,631 stores in 32 states and an additional 1,300 or so licensed or joint venture stores in 13 foreign countries. Under Eller's leadership, the company grew from annual sales of $747 million ($ in  dollars) to over $3 billion ($ in  dollars).

In 1988, the company sent a letter to its over 8,000 employees announcing that it will cut off the medical coverage of those who become sick or injured as a result of AIDS, alcohol, drug abuse or self-inflicted wounds. The company stated that "There are certain lifestyle decisions that we are just not going to assure the results of."

Fortunes declined in the late 1980s as the US economy began to slow down, and Circle K filed for Chapter 11 bankruptcy protection in May 1990; Eller resigned as CEO. Some underperforming locations were sold or closed. In 1993 the company was purchased by Investcorp, an international investment group, and emerged from bankruptcy.

In 1996, Circle K was acquired by Tosco Corporation, an independent petroleum refiner and marketer, but kept its headquarters in Phoenix. Tosco was purchased in 2001 by Phillips Petroleum, which, in 2002, merged with Conoco to form ConocoPhillips. In 2003, Circle K was purchased by Alimentation Couche-Tard, a large, multinational convenience store operator based in the Montreal area, for US$830 million ($ in  dollars).

In 2005, Taiwan's OK Convenience Store chain terminated its franchise agreement with Circle K.

In 2006, the company acquired the 90-store Spectrum chain serving Georgia and Alabama, the CFM chain in Missouri, 35 Sterling Dairy locations in Northwest Ohio, and 26 stores under various brands from Chico Enterprises of Morgantown, West Virginia. This came after the 2005 rebranding of the various Couche-Tard stores (Mac's, Bigfoot, Dairy Mart, and Handy Andy) under the more nationally known Circle K brand.

In mid-2006, Alimentation Couche-Tard entered into a franchising agreement with ConocoPhillips to brand some of its company-owned stores as Circle K, in the western portion of the US. ConocoPhillips remodeled the stores into the Circle K scheme but continued to operate them. The stores continued to have the new ConocoPhillips unified canopy design and ProClean gasolines. These stores were spun off as Phillips 66 in May 2012.

Another oil company, Canada-based Irving Oil, leased out its convenience stores operating under the Bluecanoe and Mainway banners in the United States and Atlantic Canada to Couche-Tard, which rebranded the locations to Circle K in July 2008, while still selling Irving-branded fuel. However, the Mainways in Newfoundland and Labrador did not change until summer 2010. The parties had earlier formed a similar partnership in Quebec, with the stores there operated as Couche-Tard.

In April 2009, ExxonMobil sold 43 Phoenix stores to parent company Couche-Tard as part of a sale of the larger On the Run franchise. These 43 stores were to be rebranded under the Circle K name.

In July 2010, Circle K had dropped down to fourth rank in number of stores (3,455), behind 7-Eleven (6,523 stores), BP (4,730 stores), and Shell (4,630 convenience stores) in 2010.

On February 10, 2014, Modelo Group Sold the Tiendas Extra brand of stores to the Mexican franchise of Circle K, Circulo K.

On December 18, 2014, Couche-Tard announced its acquisition of The Pantry for $860 million all-cash tender ($ in  dollars). The acquisition closed in March 2015. Following the closing, all stores that were owned and operated by The Pantry, many of them under the "Kangaroo Express" name, were expected to be rebranded under the Circle K banner.

On August 12, 2015, Circle K opened its first five convenience stores in Costa Rica, Central America, after having bought and rebranded the local convenience store chain Delimart.

On September 23, 2015, Couche-Tard unveiled a refreshed brand identity for Circle K, and announced that the Statoil (Northern, Central and Eastern Europe) and Mac's (English Canada) brands would be converted to Circle K.

In 2016, Couche-Tard acquired the Irish service station chain Topaz. In April 2018, Couche-Tard announced that they too would be rebranded to Circle K. Couche-Tard similarly acquired Imperial Oil's Esso retail locations in Ontario (228) and Quebec (50) the same year, and rebranded the convenience stores in Ontario (many of which previously operating under the On the Run brand) to Circle K.

In 2017, Couche-Tard completed its acquisition of CST Brands, adding stores formerly owned by Valero Energy, and a portion of the Ultramar chain in Canada to Circle K (with the latter also switching fuel suppliers to Irving).

Also in 2017, Couche-Tard bought Holiday Stationstores, a Minnesota-based chain of gas stations in the midwest United States. The company subsequently extended business practices from Holiday to its North American stores, including piloting a food service model adapted from that of Holiday.

In September 2021, Circle K announced the purchase of 10 convenience and food stores from the Griffin Group in Ireland. All the stores being bought are in Dublin and located in busy areas such as O’Connell Street, College Green, Grafton Street and Sandyford.

In February 2022, Couche-Tard announced that it would rebrand 12 Holiday Stationstores locations in Sioux Falls, South Dakota to Circle K.

A May 2022 report in The Wall Street Journal reported that Circle K parent Alimentation Couche-Tard is in talks to buy EG Group. Should a deal go through, it would significantly boost Circle K's presence in several U.S. markets (especially Florida, New England and Ohio) as well as giving it a location in every state except Utah. Internationally, it would give Circle K access to Australia, Western Europe, and EG Group's home market of the United Kingdom. Some have speculated that the deal may be in response to Alimentation Couche-Tard having been outbid by its primary rival 7-Eleven for the American Speedway chain.

Wage violations

A 2021 report on wage theft by the Center for Public Integrity named Circle K as one of the "worst offenders" in the United States. A class-action lawsuit was brought against the company in 2014, for which the company agreed in 2019 to pay a settlement of US$8.3 million. Circle K settled a similar class-action lawsuit in 2015 as well.

Frosters and Polar Pops
Fountain drinks at Circle K are sold in Polar Pop cups, previously called Thirst Busters, are available in expanded polystyrene cups. In areas where polystyrene containers are illegal, plastic or paper cups are offered. The 52-ounce cups are plastic. Most American locations offer any size, 32 ounce or under for under $1 while 52oz or above cups are priced at over a dollar. The price point of its 44-ounce size (marketed as "Epic XL" in some regions) may vary, as it may be under or over $1, depending on region.

The Polar Pop was first introduced in Bigfoot convenience stores by Johnson Oil Company in Columbus, Indiana, prior to its acquisition by Alimentation Couche-Tard. After the acquisition, the company began rebranding fountain drinks in other stores owned by Couche-Tard. As of 2018, Circle K sells 17 Polar Pops every second in the United States.

The Froster, which was introduced to Mac's stores in 1998, became very popular throughout Western Canada and Ontario. The American version of the Froster was introduced in 1999.

Sponsorship
Circle K was a part-time primary sponsor of the No. 28 IndyCar Series racecar driven by Ryan Hunter-Reay of Andretti Autosport between 2011 and 2013. In 2014, it switched to KVSH Racing driver Sébastien Bourdais. Circle K, along with Oberto Sausage Company, currently sponsors Marco Andretti.

In 2017, Circle K went to NASCAR, sponsoring Matt Kenseth and Joe Gibbs Racing with full livery for six races. It was on the car when Kenseth won his final NASCAR Cup Race at that year's  fall race at Phoenix Raceway.

Also in 2017, Circle K became the official shirt sponsor of United Soccer League side North Carolina FC and signed a two-year sponsorship agreement with the Lithuanian Basketball League.

Due to its sizable presence in Greater Cleveland, from the former Lawson/Dairy Mart stores, Circle K sponsors the Cleveland Guardians strikeout sign. It is located in center field at Progressive Field in Cleveland. The "K" logo represents the "K" used for strikeouts in traditional baseball scorekeeping and is replicated with each strikeout. The same sponsorship is in place with the Arizona Diamondbacks at Chase Field. If the Diamondbacks strike out ten batters or more, the game's attendees receive a voucher for a free cup of Polar Pop, while Guardians fans receive the same voucher after select home games.

In May 2017, a sponsored Circle K Power Cube was introduced into the online game Ingress.

Explanatory notes

See also

 Circle K Sunkus
 List of automotive fuel retailers
 List of convenience stores

References

External links

 USA and Canada site

 Ireland site

1951 establishments in Texas
American subsidiaries of foreign companies
Alimentation Couche-Tard
Companies based in Tempe, Arizona
Convenience stores of Canada
Convenience stores of the United States
Franchises
Li & Fung
Gas stations in the United States
Retail companies established in 1951
Fast-food chains of the United States
Companies that filed for Chapter 11 bankruptcy in 1990
2003 mergers and acquisitions